The 2010–11 Australian cricket season consists of international matches played by the Australian cricket team in Australia as well as Australian domestic cricket matches under the auspices of Cricket Australia.

Australian Cricket Team

Sheffield Shield cricket

One Day domestic cricket

The Ryobi One-Day Cup will open on 6 October 2010 with a match between the Queensland Bulls and the Tasmanian Tigers

Twenty20 Domestic

References

 
Australia 2010-11
Australia 2010-11